James Tod Flower Jr. (October 17, 1895 – May 6, 1956) was a professional football player with the Columbus Panhandles and the Akron Pros of the American Professional Football Association (renamed the National Football League in 1922). He also served as a player-coach for the Pros in 1924, guiding the team to a 2–6 record.

Before he joined the NFL, Jim played college football and basketball at Ohio State. In 1919, Flower recovered a blocked Michigan punt in the end zone for a touchdown in a 13-3 Buckeyes win.

References
Hard Test for Buckeyes
The Game Classics

1895 births
1956 deaths
Players of American football from Ohio
Akron Pros coaches
Akron Pros players
Columbus Panhandles players
Ohio State Buckeyes football players